Henry Alexander Anderson (17 July 1888 –8 November 1939) was a Scottish footballer perhaps best known for his time at Raith Rovers. He also played for the Scotland national team.

Born in Dennistoun, Anderson made his senior debut at Hibernian as an inside forward before joining Raith Rovers in the summer of 1912. He was part of the team that reached the Scottish Cup final in 1913, which Raith lost to Falkirk. Anderson earned a Scotland cap the following year in a goalless draw with Wales.

During World War I (in which he served in the Royal Field Artillery and was promoted to Corporal) he moved to St Mirren, initially on loan, and won a Victory Cup winner's medal with the Paisley club in 1919. He ended his career with Clydebank and retired in 1922.

His elder brother David was also a footballer whose clubs included Hibernian and Third Lanark; the siblings played together with both clubs (for two seasons with Hibs and in a handful of matches with Thirds in 1915).

References

External links

Harry Anderson, www.ihibs.co.uk
International stats at Londonhearts.com

1888 births
1939 deaths
Scottish footballers
Scotland international footballers
Vale of Clyde F.C. players
Raith Rovers F.C. players
Third Lanark A.C. players
St Mirren F.C. players
Hibernian F.C. players
Scottish Junior Football Association players
Scottish Football League players
Association football wing halves
Clydebank F.C. (1914) players
British Army personnel of World War I
Royal Field Artillery soldiers
Footballers from Glasgow
People from Dennistoun
People from Govanhill and Crosshill